Arc Angel is the first studio album by Connecticut-based AOR band Arc Angel.

Track listing 

Side 1
 "Stars" - 5:02
 "Tragedy" - 3:33
 "Wanted: Dead Or Alive" - 3:28*
 "Used to Think I'd Never Fall in Love" - 3:51
 "Rock Me Tonight" - 3:30

Side 2
 "Before the Storm" - 1:40
 "Sidelines" - 3:46
 "Confession" - 3:12
 "Just Another Romance" - 4:10
 "King of the Mountain" - 4:45

*"Wanted: Dead or Alive" was recorded by April Wine on their 1985 album Walking Through Fire.

Personnel

 Jeff Cannata - Lead and backing vocals, drums, bass, acoustic and electric guitar
 Michael Soldan - Keyboards and backing vocals
 Scott Spray - Bass
 Kevin Nugent - Guitar solo
 Jim Gregory - Bass
 Jay Jesse Johnson - Lead and rhythm guitar
 James Christian - Backing vocals
 Frank Simms - Backing vocals
 David Coe - Guitar
 Tony Airdo - Backing vocals
 Jeff Batter - Piano
 Jeff Bova - Oberheim
 Doug Katsaros - Piano
 Hugh McDonald - Bass
 Chuck Burgi III - Bass
 Lance Quinn - Electric guitar
 Brent Diamond - Synthesizer
 Lennie Petze - Harmonica
 Jayeanne Sartoretto - Vocals
 David Wolff - Synthesizer
 Bud Vumback - Bass

Notes 

1983 debut albums
Portrait Records albums